Salda is a rural locality (a selo) in Chorodinsky Selsoviet, Tlyaratinsky District, Republic of Dagestan, Russia. The population was 358 as of 2010.

Geography 
Salda is located 31 km southeast of Tlyarata (the district's administrative centre) by road. Choroda is the nearest rural locality.

References 

Rural localities in Tlyaratinsky District